A cherub is a supernatural being in the Bible. For the word commonly used for winged babies in artwork, see putto.

Cherub or Cherubs may also refer to:

 Charleroi Cherubs, a basketball team in Pennsylvania, USA
 , a British navy ship
 Cherub (dinghy), a class of dinghy
 CHERUB, a series of spy novels by Robert Muchamore
 Bristol Cherub, an aircraft engine
 Cherubim (Wrinkle in Time Character), character from Wrinkle in Time

Music
 Cherub (musical duo), American electro-indie duo from Nashville, Tennessee
 Cherubs (UK band), active from 2003–2007
 Cherubs (US band), noise rock band formed in 1991
 "Cherub" (song), a 2020 song by Ball Park Music
 "Cherub Rock", a song by the Smashing Pumpkins from their 1993 album Siamese Dream

See also
 Cheru (disambiguation)